The 1920–21 season was the 22nd season for FC Barcelona.

Results

External links

webdelcule.com
webdelcule.com

References

FC Barcelona seasons
Barcelona